These are the squads for the countries that played in the 1920 South American Championship. The participating countries were Argentina, Brazil, Chile and Uruguay. The teams plays in a single round-robin tournament, earning two points for a win, one point for a draw, and zero points for a loss.

Argentina
Head Coach: Federal Technical Committee

Brazil
Head coach:  Oswaldo Gomes

Chile
Head Coach:  Juan Carlos Bertone

Uruguay
Head Coach:  Ernesto Fígoli

References

External links 
RSSSF South American Championship squads

Squads

Copa América squads